Acridoschema isidori is a species of beetle in the family Cerambycidae. It was described by Chevrolat in 1858.

References

Acmocerini
Beetles described in 1858